Mahir (also spelled Maher or "Mihir-A") is an Arabic given name meaning "skilled" or "expert", may refer to the following:

Given name

Maher
Maher Arar, Canadian software engineer
Maher al-Assad, brother of Syrian President Bashar al-Assad and head of the Presidential Guard
Maher Sabry, Egyptian filmmaker, writer and gay rights activist
Maher Al Sayed, Syrian football player 
Maher-shalal-hash-baz, son of Biblical prophet Isaiah
Maher Shalal Hash Baz, artistic alter ego of Tori Kudo, a Japanese naivist composer and musician
Maher Charif, Palestinian historian and lecturer at the Institut français du Proche-Orient in Syria

Mahir

First name
 Mahir Agva (born 1996), German basketball player
 Mahir Çayan (1946–1972), Turkish communist leader
 Mahir Çağrı (born 1962), Internet celebrity
 Mahir Halili (born 1975), Albanian footballer
 Mahir Jasem (born 1989), Emirati footballer
 Mahir Muradov (1956–2023), Azerbaijani judge
 Mahir Sağlık (born 1983), Turkish footballer
 Mahir Tomruk (1885–1949), Turkish sculptor
 Mahir Yağcılar (born 1961), Turkish Kosovar politician
 Mahir al-Zubaydi (died 2008), al-Qaeda military commander

Middle name
 Ahmad Mahir Pasha (1888–1945), Egyptian politician
 Ahmad Mahir Pasha (1888–1945), former Prime Minister of Egypt
 Ali Mahir Pasha (1882–1960), Egyptian politician
 T H Mahir

See also
Maher (disambiguation)
Maher (surname), including the Arabic surname
Ahmad Maher (disambiguation), various people
Mahershala Ali, American actor

Arabic masculine given names
Turkish masculine given names